Fossilcalcaridae is an extinct Mygalomorphae spider family in the clade Avicularioidea containing the single species Fossilcalcar praeteritus.  The family genus and species were described in 2015 from a male fossil entombed in Cretaceous age Burmese amber.

References

†
†